Estarabad-e Shomali Rural District is a rural district (dehestan) in Baharan District, Gorgan County, Golestan Province, Iran. At the 2006 census, its population was 17,553, in 4,423 families.  The rural district has 17 villages.

References 

Rural Districts of Golestan Province
Gorgan County